María Teresa Laparra Samayoa (25 December 1901 – 30 September 1988) was a Guatemalan activist and the former First Lady of Guatemala from March 2, 1958 until  March 31, 1963. She was the widow of the former President of Guatemala, Miguel Ydígoras Fuentes.

María Teresa Laparra de Ydígoras was the daughter of Brígido Laparra and María Samayoa. She assumed the position of First Lady when her husband won the presidential elections, later she left together with her husband after the coup d'état.

Ydigoras died on October 27, 1982. Laparra died on September 30, 1988.

References

1901 births
1988 deaths
First ladies of Guatemala